Philip Alan Wilkinson (born 23 August 1951 at Hucknall) is an English former first-class cricketer active 1971–77 who played for Nottinghamshire in 92 first-class and 90 List A matches.

References

External links
 

1951 births
English cricketers
Nottinghamshire cricketers
Living people
People from Hucknall
Cricketers from Nottinghamshire
20th-century English people